This is an incomplete list of video games which strongly feature vampires. This includes games where the player character is a vampire, or where a vampire is the primary antagonist, as well as games which feature vampires as the primary enemy variant. Games which feature dhampirs, half-vampires, in the same way are also included.

List

References

 
Vampire